Ohio State Route 698 (OH 698) is a north–south state route in northwestern Ohio.

Route description 
OH 698 begins in a fairly rural setting at OH 103 in Van Buren Township. OH 698 follows Main Street through the village, passing by a few side streets on the way through. Heading north out of Jenera, OH 698 enters into a rural area primarily consisting of farmland, with an occasional house popping up along the way. OH 698 passes by Hancock County Road 24, and enters into Eagle Township.

Into Eagle Township, OH 698 has intersections with Township Road 34, Township Road 25, County Road 26 and County Road 37, all the while seeing little change in the landscape, and following a very straight path.  OH 698 experiences some slight curvature north of County Road 37, but resumes a straight, northerly trek as it passes by Township Road 43 and Township Road 44.  Further north, OH 698 arrives at its southern intersection with Township Road 48, crosses over I-75 without fanfare, then crosses its northern intersection with Township Road 48.  OH 698 comes to an end as it arrives at County Road 313, which at one time was the routing of US 25.

History

OH 698 made its debut in 1937, running between US 30 (currently Old US 30) four miles west of Williamstown and US 25 (currently Hancock County Road 313) five miles southwest of Findlay.

No significant changes took place in the routing of OH 698 for about 70 years.  In 2007, however, in conjunction with the opening of the new four-lane expressway alignment of US 30 through Hancock and Wyandot Counties, the southern end of OH 698 was truncated to its intersection with OH 103 just south of Jenera.

Major intersections

References

External links

698
Transportation in Hancock County, Ohio